Drexel 4302, also known as the Sambrook Book based on an inscription from a former owner, Francis Sambrook, is a music manuscript containing vocal and keyboard music from Italian and British composers, documenting the transition from Renaissance to Baroque music. Though literature on the manuscript has assumed the copyist was Francis Tregian the Younger, recent analysis has demolished that hypothesis (not without some musicological contention).

Belonging to the New York Public Library, it forms part of the Music Division's Drexel Collection, located at the New York Public Library for the Performing Arts. Following traditional library practice, its name is derived from its call number.

False attribution 

The origins of Drexel 4302 or reasons why it came into existence are unknown. For many years it was thought to have been copied by Francis Tregian the Younger during his incarceration in Fleet Prison from about 1608 until his death in 1618. Based on a physical analysis of the manuscript (and an analysis of writings on Tregian), Ruby Reid Thompson has shown that not only is this attribution extremely unlikely, but that the basis for the belief of Tregian's to the manuscript was also very tenuous.

Physical description 

Thompson found that Drexel 4302 consists of original 257 folios. Five of these sheets are of high quality paper made by the Düring family of Basel, Switzerland. The remaining 252 folios were made by the Wendelin Riehel mill in Strasbourg. (Most of the paper used in English manuscripts can be traced to France and Italy, and to a lesser extent in the Rhine region including Basel and Strasbourg.)  Beyond the Fitzwilliam Virginal Book, Egerton 3665 (in the British Library), and Mus. 510-514A in the Christ Church Library, Thompson found no other music manuscripts that used either of these papers. Expanding her search, she found use of these papers in England and its use on the continent was scarce. She found that three of Inigo Jones drawings used Düring paper with a similar (but not identical) watermark, all connected to the court and dating 1619-1624. Thompson concluded: "All the manuscripts containing such papers are found in documents relating to the cultural activities or the official business of the royal courts. Thus a corresponding connection may exist between the four music manuscripts [the Fitzwilliam Virginal Book, Egerton 3665, Mus. 510-514A and Drexel 4302] and the musical activities of the English court.

Originally of German Regal size (a standard used at the time), the height of the folios indicate they have been only slightly trimmed.

The manuscript has twenty-one gatherings. Ten of these are perfect (meaning that no leaves were removed or were added to the gathering), implying they were copied by professional copyists. The remaining eleven gatherings are now imperfect with diverse structures (meaning that leaves were removed or added). The outer leaves of all the gatherings show greater wear than the inner leaves, indicating that the gatherings were originally separate and used independently. Only later were they brought together and bound to create an aggregate volume.

Although many music manuscripts of this time are laid out page by page, the scores in Drexel 4302 are generally laid out across two facing pages. This means that a line of music will begin on a verso of a leaf and continue to the recto of the following leaf before continuing on the previous verso.

Dating 
Until Thompson's article, most writers assumed the final date of copying of the manuscript close to Tregian's death. Since Thompson discredited the hypothesis of Tregian's involvement, she suggested that an estimation of date need not be influenced by Tregian's death date. Based on Persons' thesis, some works could have been copied from Il Parnasso published in Antwerp in 1613—a date that suggests an approximate time frame.

Provenance 

The earliest identified owner of Drexel 4302 was Francis Sambrook who inscribed his name on various parts of the manuscript, including the front cover. Exactly which Francis Sambrook this was is an open question. Edward F. Rimbault (a later owner) had written on the first page that Sambrook died in 1660 and was buried at Salisbury. But Bertram Schofield and Thurston Dart wrote that there was apparently another Francis Sambrook who was Clerk of Records to the Bishop of Salisbury Courts in 1662 to whom composer Henry Lawes left the compositions of his brother William Lawes. Exact identification awaits further investigation as there were several people named Francis Sambrook active during the mid-17th century.

Subsequent owners are known from their inscriptions on the manuscript's initial pages. The first is signed "Dr. Allcock" who Jerry C. Persons identifies as the organist and composer John Alcock (1715-1806). It reads: "All the following Music was wrote out of the Vatican (or Pope's Library) at Rome." This is followed by a statement signed by "Rev. John Parker": "I do not find any authority for this assertion by Dr. Alcock.". Persons identifies Parker as the vicar of St. George's, London, who "copied out madrigals for himself." 

It is not known how Edward F. Rimbault came to own the manuscript, although it is not surprising considering he owned many unique English manuscripts. After his death in 1876, it was listed in the catalog of his estate as lot 1379:

MOTETTS, ANTHEMS, MADRIGALS, and Instrumental Pieces...A very large collection in a thick folio volume, in the original binding, rebacked--Autographs of Francis Sambrook (ob. 1660), by whom the collection was probably transcribed, and John Alcock, 1745--Manuscript notes by Dr. Alcock, Rev. John Parker, and Dr. Rimbault, a few leaves damaged by damp

The manuscript was one of about 600 lots purchased by Philadelphia-born financier Joseph W. Drexel, who had already amassed a large music library. Upon Drexel's death, he bequeathed his music library to The Lenox Library. When the Lenox Library merged with the Astor Library to become the New York Public Library, the Drexel Collection became the basis for one of its founding units, the Music Division. Today Drexel 4302 is part of the Drexel Collection in the Music Division, now located at the New York Public Library for the Performing Arts at Lincoln Center.

Handwriting 

In discussing the handwriting, Thompson differentiates between abrupt and gradual changes of script (both indicating a different scribe). She noted thirty changes of script (seven sudden and twenty-three gradual). In conjunction with her analysis of Egerton 3665, she noted that Drexel 4302 shares nine scripts with that manuscript.

Because they believed that it was in the same hand as the Fitzwilliam Virginal Book and Egerton 3665, Schoefield and Dart thought Drexel 4302 should be considered a continuation of the latter. Thompson has shown that only nine scribal hands are shared between Drexel 4302 and Egerton 3665 (the cumulation of both indicate seventeen different hands) and that these hands are not the same as that of the Fitzwilliam Virginal Book.

Organization 
Section contents:
Motets by various composers
"Motetti a 5 di Alfonso Ferabosco Figliulo"
"Motetti di Alfonso Ferabosco il Padre a 6"
"Madrigali a 6" by William Daman
"Madrigali a 6 di Luca Marenzio"
"Madrigali a 6 di Pietro Philippi"
"Pavan Passamezzo di Pietro Philippi a 6"
"Madrigali a 6 di diversi autori"
"Madrigali a 8 di Pietro Philippi"

Observations  
Because many of the writings on Drexel 4302 appeared before Ruby Reid Thompson's 1992 and 2001 articles discrediting a single copyist for Drexel 4302 and Egerton 3665, writers often made comparisons between the two manuscripts.

Much of the music from the early 17th century, whether printed or in manuscript, is available only in parts. Edward Lowinsky observed that Drexel 4302 (along with Egerton 3665 and R.M. 24 d.2 in the British Library) provided evidence for the dissemination of the new practice of using scores in early 17th century England.

Bertram Schofield and Thurston Dart noted that both Drexel 4302 and Egerton 3665 consist primarily of English and Italian madrigals. They observed that a marginal note in Egerton 3665 regarding the setting Italia mia ("ex libris Henr. 8, circa annum 1520") is the same note found in a marginal note of an anonymous motet of Drexel 4302 and conclude that the same source was used for the fantasies by Philip van Wilder.

Richard Charteris noted that one of the significant features of Drexel 4302 (and Egerton 3665) are the designations of the three composers named Alfonso Ferrabosco (Alfonso Ferrabosco the elder (1543–1588), Alfonso Ferrabosco the younger (1575–1628) and Alfonso Ferrabosco III (junior) (died 1652)). Both Egerton 3665 and Drexel 4302 indicate "il padre" and "il figliuolo" in titles and "Alfonso Ferrabosco senior" and "Alfonso Ferrabosco junior" for individual pieces. 

In his study of the song Amarilli, mia bella and its transmission, Tim Carter noted the importance to Drexel 4302 of publications from the publishing firm Phalesius. The firm was founded in the 16th century by Petrus Phalesius the Elder, whose sons continued it in the 17th century (at the time the manuscript would have been copied). Carter noted that all publications of composer Peter Philips were printed by Phalesius, and that he edited one of Phalesius' anthologies, implying a close relationship between composer and the firm. These publications were significant sources to the copyists of Drexel 4302. Carter posits that the copyist of Drexel 4302 apparently knew Phalesius' 1601 anthology because the manuscript includes arrangements of eight six-part madrigals from the publication.

Carter observed that both Drexel 4302 and Egerton 3665 were important to the transmission of "Amarilli, mia bella."  The song was first published in Ghirlanda di madrigalia sei voci, di diversie eccellentissimi autori de nostri tempi, raccolta di giardini di fiori odoriferi musicali issued in 1601 by the Antwerp printer Petrus Phalesius the Younger (RISM 16015). Carter noted that the copyist of Drexel 4302 copied Amarilli, mia bella on pages 502-18 (nos. 105-15). This copyist created a three-part setting of the work by taking only three of the six parts. Carter observed that this procedure noting some "curious gaps" in the voicing. Rather than copy out the slightly altered repeat, the copyist substituted repeat signs, resulting in an ending that Carter terms "unworkable."

List of contents 
This list is based on the online RISM database (see External links below), Persons's thesis, and an examination of the microfilm of the manuscript. With the exception of the initial heading, all subsequent headings are in the manuscript.

Explanation of column headings:
"Drexel no." These numbers are those penned by the copyists who numbered each work (each part of a work received a separate number)
Folios: The folios of the manuscript
Composer: name of the composer
Title: Title of work, including parts within a work
Scoring: Following conventional abbreviations (s=soprano; a=alto; t=tenor; b=bass; two or more letters indicate multiple section of that vocal range)
Notes in manuscript: Persons transcribed when the copyists included an authorial attribution or included other notes
Possible source: Persons proposed various printed sources for works included in the manuscript. In some cases he found no printed source so he mentioned contemporaneous manuscripts that include the work

See also 
Francis Tregian the Younger

References

Works consulted 

 (JSTOR access by subscription)
 (JSTOR access by subscription)

  (JSTOR access by subscription)

 (JSTOR access by subscription)
 
 (JSTOR access by subscription)

External links 
NYPL Catalog entry
RISM entry
DIAMM (Digital Image Archive of Medieval Music) entry for Drexel 4302

17th-century manuscripts
Baroque music manuscript sources
Manuscripts in the New York Public Library
English manuscripts
Music anthologies
Music sources